Menesiniella is a genus of the barnacle family Balanidae that includes the following species:

Menesiniella advena Zullo, 1992
Menesiniella aquila (Pilsbry, 1907)
Menesiniella regalis (Pilsbry, 1916)

References

External links

Barnacles